Kazu Hiro (born Kazuhiro Tsuji,  ; born May 26, 1969) is a Japanese-born American special make-up effects artist and visual artist. He won the Academy Award for Best Makeup and Hairstyling for the biographical films Darkest Hour (2017) and Bombshell (2019) after earning nominations for the comedies Click (2006) and Norbit (2007).

Life and career
Kazu Hiro grew up in Kyoto, where he spent much of his time alone engaging in art projects. Kazu Hiro came across an issue of Fangoria which featured Dick Smith and his work turning Hal Holbrook into Abraham Lincoln for the 1976 miniseries Lincoln. This led to Kazu Hiro's own experiments with special make-up effects, photos of which he began sending to Dick Smith after discovering his P.O. box in the back of a magazine. The two would eventually meet in person when Smith traveled to Japan to work on Kiyoshi Kurosawa's Sweet Home. Smith invited Kazu Hiro to work on the film with him and this began his film career.

While working on Sweet Home, Kazu Hiro met fellow artist Eddie Yang, who was visiting from the United States. In 1996, Kazu Hiro moved to Los Angeles to work with Yang and Smith's protege, Rick Baker, on his first U.S. work, Men in Black. Continuing his work with Baker, Kazu Hiro worked on many projects including Dr. Seuss' How the Grinch Stole Christmas for which he won a BAFTA.

Kazu Hiro crafted the silicone model of Brad Pitt's head used to artificially age him via CGI for The Curious Case of Benjamin Button in 2008. In 2012, Kazu Hiro created the prosthetics which turned Joseph Gordon-Levitt into a young Bruce Willis for Looper.

After his work on Looper, Kazu Hiro retired from the film industry and focus on sculpture, crafting giant busts of people such as Frida Kahlo, Salvador Dalí, Abraham Lincoln, as well as Smith.

For the 2017 film Darkest Hour, Gary Oldman talked Kazu Hiro out of retirement to create the Winston Churchill prosthetics. Oldman had been considered for the role of General Thade in Tim Burton's Planet of the Apes (the role went to his  Rosencrantz & Guildenstern Are Dead co-star, Tim Roth) and Kazu Hiro's work at that time had impressed Oldman enough that for him, Kazu Hiro was the only man to turn him into Churchill. For this work, Kazu Hiro won the 2018 Academy Award for Best Makeup and Hairstyling.

He won the award again in 2020 for his work in the 2019 film Bombshell, where he made prosthetics for Charlize Theron as news anchor Megyn Kelly.

Personal life
In March 2019, Tsuji became an American citizen and officially changed his name to Kazu Hiro. At the 2020 Academy Awards, Kazu Hiro said he became an American citizen because he "got tired" of Japanese culture, which he found "too submissive" and a place where it is "hard to make a dream come true".

Filmography

Awards and nominations

References

External links
 Kazu Hiro

Living people
1969 births
American artists of Japanese descent
American make-up artists
Artists from Kyoto
Artists from Los Angeles
Best Makeup Academy Award winners
Best Makeup BAFTA Award winners
Japanese emigrants to the United States
Japanese make-up artists
People with acquired American citizenship
Special effects people